BZH may refer to:
 BZH, the short form for Breizh, Brittany in Breton language,
 .bzh, an internet domain for the Breton culture and languages

BZH means also in aviation code :
 Brit Air (France)
 Naberezhnye Chelny in Tatarstan (Russia)